Chersky Airport (also Cherskiy)  is a small airport in the Sakha Republic, Russia, located  south of the settlement of Chersky. It services small transport aircraft.

Airlines and destinations

External links
  Airport Chersky Aviateka.Handbook

References
RussianAirFields.com

Airports built in the Soviet Union
Airports in the Arctic
Airports in the Sakha Republic